Philippe Volter (23 March 1959 – 13 April 2005) was a Belgian actor and director. Born Philippe Wolter to theatre director Claude Volter and his wife, actress Jacqueline Bir, Volter began his career in Brussels in 1985.

He made many stage and film appearances, the latter of which peaked with such arthouse films as The Music Teacher (1988), The Double Life of Véronique (1991) and Blue (1993). Other appearances include Macbeth (1987) and The Five Senses (1999). Upon his father's death in 2002, he returned to Belgium and became artistic director for the Comedy Claude Volter.

Volter committed suicide in 2005, aged 46.

Filmography

External links
 

1959 births
2005 suicides
Belgian male film actors
Belgian male stage actors
Belgian theatre directors
Suicides in France
2005 deaths